Phil Stevens may refer to:

 Phil Stevens (footballer), Australian rules footballer
 Phil Stevens (ice hockey), Canadian ice hockey player
 Phil Stevens (character), a fictional character in Scream 2

See also
 Philip Stephens (disambiguation)
 Stevens (surname)